Holognathidae is a family of crustaceans belonging to the order Isopoda.

Genera:
 Chongxidotea
 Cleantioides Kensley & Kaufman, 1978
 Cleantis Dana, 1849
 Holognathus Thomson, 1904
 Zenobianopsis Hale, 1946

References

Isopoda